Menno Township is a township in Marion County, Kansas, United States.  As of the 2010 census, the township population was 330.

Geography

Cities and towns
The township contains the following settlements:
 No cities or unincorporated communities.

Cemeteries
The township contains the following cemeteries:
 Alexanderwohl Mennonite Church Cemetery, located in Section 33 T20S R1E.
 Gnadenfeld Community Cemetery (Schroeder Cemetery), located in Section 16 T20S R1E.
 Lutheran Church Cemetery (Early), located in Section 11 T20S R1E.
 Richert Cemetery, located in Section 22 T20S R1E.
 Springfeld / Springfield K.M.B. Cemetery, located in Section 8 T20S R1E.
 Steinbach Community Cemetery, located in Section 14 T20S R1E.
 Wedel Cemetery ( Blumenfeld Cemetery), located in Section 31 T20S R1E.
 Wiebe Cemetery P.A. (a.k.a. North Springfield Cemetery), located in Section 7 T20S R1E.
 Schroeder / Hochfeld Cemetery, located in Section 20 T20S R1E.
 Blumfeld Cemetery (a.k.a. Wedel Cemetery), located in Section 31 T20S R1E.
 Duerksen Cemetery, located in Section 14 T20S R1E.
 John Banman Cemetery, located in Section 19 T20S R1E.
 Heinrich Franzen Cemetery, located in Section 17 T20S R1E.
 Andrew Schmidt Cemetery, located in Section 19 T20S R1E.
 Peter Schmidt Cemetery, located in Section 29 T20S R1E.
 Peter Unrau Cemetery, located in Section 29 T20S R1E.

Transportation
K-15 highway passes north to south through the township.

References

Further reading

External links
 Marion County website
 City-Data.com
 Marion County maps: Current, Historic, KDOT

Townships in Marion County, Kansas
Townships in Kansas